The 2009–10 Pacific-10 Conference women's basketball season began in October and ended with the Pac-10 Tournament on March 11–14, 2010 at the Galen Center, Los Angeles, California. Stanford won both the regular season and the tournament championships. Stanford and UCLA were selected to participate in the NCAA tournament. Stanford was the runner-up of the NCAA National Championship and completed the season with a 36-2 record. Cal won the WNIT Championship.

Pre-season
 Michael Cooper was hired as new coach for the USC Trojans.
 Paul Westhead became the new coach for the Oregon Ducks.

2009-10 Pac-10 Women's Basketball Coaches' Pre-season Poll: 
 1. Stanford 
2. California
 3. Arizona State
 4. UCLA 
 5. USC 
 6. Washington State
 7. Oregon State 
 8. Oregon 
 9. Arizona 
 10. Washington

Rankings

 Stanford has been ranked #2 in the polls.
 March 1, 2010 – UCLA Bruins is rated No. 25 in the ESPN/USA Today Coaches' Poll.
 March 8, 2010 – Stanford #2, UCLA #23 (AP Top 25).
 April 7, 2010 – Stanford #2, UCLA #23 (final USA Today/ESPN coaches poll)

Conference games
 January 31, 2010 – At the half point mark of the conference season, Stanford is on top of the standings, followed by UCLA and USC at second place.

Conference tournament

2010 State Farm Pacific-10 Conference women's basketball tournament was a post season tournament for the women's basketball teams in the Pacific-10 Conference. The games were held on Thursday through Sunday, March 11–14, at the Galen Center (Los Angeles, California). Tournament winner became the NCAA tournament automatic qualifier. Stanford again was the winner.

Last year, Stanford won the tournament over USC, 89–64.

Head coaches

 Niya Butts, Arizona
 Charli Turner Thorne, Arizona State
 Joanne Boyle, California
 Paul Westhead, Oregon
 LaVonda Wagner, Oregon State
 Tara VanDerveer, Stanford
 Nikki Caldwell, UCLA
 Michael Cooper, USC
 Tia Jackson, Washington
 June Daugherty, Washington State

Post season

NCAA tournament
 Saturday, March 20 - First Round, #1-seed Stanford def. #16-seed UC Riverside 79–47, at Sacramento Regional, Stanford, CA
 Sunday, March 21 – First Round, #8-seed UCLA def. #9-seed NC State 74-54, at Kansas City Regional, Minneapolis, MN
 Monday, March 22 – Second Round, Stanford def. #8 Iowa 96-67, at Sacramento Regional, Stanford, CA
 Tuesday, March 23 – Second Round, Nebraska def. UCLA 83-70, at Kansas City Regional, Minneapolis, MN
 Saturday, March 27 – Second Round, Stanford  def. #5 Georgia 73–36, at Sacramento Regional, Sacramento, CA
 Monday, March 29, Stanford def. Xavier 55-53, at Sacramento Regional Finals,  Sacramento, CA
 Sunday, April 4, Stanford def. Oklahoma 73-66, at the Semifinals, San Antonio, Texas
 Tuesday, April 6, 5:30 PM, Connecticut def. Stanford 53-47, Alamodome, San Antonio, Texas (NCAA Championship Game)

WNIT tournament
 Wednesday, March 17 – California def. UC Davis 74-69 (OT), 7 p.m. PT (first round)
 Wednesday, March 17 – Arizona State def. New Mexico State 84-61, 6:30 p.m. PT (first round)
 Thursday, March 18 – Oregon def. Eastern Washington 95-66, 7 p.m. PT (first round)
 Tuesday, March 23 – BYU 61, Arizona State 53, 9:30 p.m. ET (second round)
 Tuesday, March 23 – California 64, Utah 54, 10 p.m. ET (second round)
 Tuesday, March 23 – Oregon 93, New Mexico 67, 10 p.m. ET (second round)
 Thursday, March 25 – California 71, Oregon 57, Eugene, Oregon (Regional)
 Saturday, March 27 – California 76, BYU, 50, Haas Pavilion, Berkeley, California (quarterfinals)
 Thursday, April 1 – California def. Illinois State 61-45, Normal, Illinois (WNIT Semifinals)
 Saturday, April 3 - California def. Miami 73-61, Berkeley, California (WNIT Championship Game)

WBI tournament
 Wednesday, March 17 – Washington def. Portland 75-44 (first round)
 Sunday, Mar. 21 – Texas A&M-Corpus Christi def. Washington, 59-58 (West Region Semifinals)

Highlights and notes
 January 21, 2010 – Pacific-10 Conference issued a public reprimand to Michael Cooper for his post-game comments following USC's game with UCLA on Sunday, January 17.

Awards and honors

Scholar-Athlete of the Year
 Jayne Appel, Stanford – Toyo Tires Pac-10 Women's Basketball Scholar-Athlete of the Year

Player-of-the-Week
2009-10 Pac-10 Players of the Week:

 Nov. 16 – Nnemkadi Ogwumike, Stanford
 Nov. 23 – Nicole Canepa, Oregon
 Nov. 30 – Kayla Pedersen, Stanford
 Dec. 7 – Amanda Johnson, Oregon
 Dec. 14 – Nnemkadi Ogwumike, Stanford
 Dec. 21 – Kayla Pedersen, Stanford
 Dec. 28 – Sami Whitcomb, Washington
 Jan. 4 – Taylor Lilley, Oregon
 Jan. 11 – Nnemkadi Ogwumike, Stanford
 Jan. 18 – Davellyn Whyte, Arizona
 Jan. 25 – Alexis Gray-Lawson, California
 Feb. 1 – Markel Walker, UCLA
 Feb. 8 – April Cook, Washington State
 Feb. 15 – Jayne Appel, Stanford
 Feb. 22 – Jayne Appel, Stanford
 Mar. 1 - Jasmine Dixon, UCLA
 Mar. 7 – Ashley Corral, USC

All-Americans

All-Pac-10 teams
The awards listed below were determined by vote of the conference coaches and announced on March 11.
Player of the Year: Nnemkadi Ogwumike, Stanford
Freshman of the Year: Davellyn White, Arizona
Defensive Player of the Year: Briana Gilbreath, USC and Rosalyn Gold-Onwude, Stanford
Coach of the Year: Nikki Caldwell, UCLA

FIRST TEAM:

All-Academic
First Team:

Second Team:

USBWA All-District team

Women's Basketball Media Awards
These end-of-season honors were voted on by media and announced on March 9.
Player of the Year: Nnemkadi Ogwumike, Stanford
Freshman of the Year: Davellyn White, Arizona
Defensive Player of the Year: Ify Ibekwe, Arizona
Coach of the Year: Nikki Caldwell, UCLA

2010 Pac-10 Media All-Pac-10
 Nnemkadi Ogwumike, Stanford 
 Jayne Appel, Stanford 
 Alexis Gray-Lawson, California 
 Kayla Pedersen, Stanford 
 Ify Ibekwe, Arizona 
 Jasmine Dixon, UCLA 
 Ashley Corral, USC 
 Taylor Lilley, Oregon 
 Danielle Orsillo, Arizona State 
 Davellyn Whyte, Arizona 
 Jeanette Pohlen, Stanford 
 Markel Walker, UCLA 
 Talisa Rhea, Oregon State 
 Sami Whitcomb, Washington 
 Briana Gilbreath, USC

References